Rabbi Dovid Feinstein (1929 – November 6, 2020) was a Torah scholar and halachic authority, considered by many as the leading halachic authority in the United States in the 21st century.  He served as the rosh yeshiva (dean) of the Mesivtha Tifereth Jerusalem yeshiva elementary and high school and kollel, inheriting the position after the passing of his father Rabbi Moshe Feinstein in 1986.  He was also a prolific and erudite author, penning at least 9 books on such topics as halacha, Torah and the Jewish calendar, as well as some very popular Passover Haggadahs.

His brother, Rabbi Reuven Feinstein, is rosh yeshiva of the Staten Island branch of Mesivtha Tifereth Jerusalem.

Biography
Rabbi Dovid Feinstein was born in 1929 in Lyuban (in present-day Belarus), where his father Rabbi Moshe Feinstein served as a rabbi of the community. He was named after his paternal grandfather, who was descended from the brother of the Vilna Gaon. When he was eight, his family moved to Manhattan, where he would reside until his death. He died at the age of 91 in 2020.

Kol Dodi
The title Kol Dodi originated in the 1970s, when Rabbi Feinstein's father was still alive, and Rabbi Feinstein would not allow his own name on the cover. Hence:
 Kol Dodi – the first three letters of Dodi spell the name Dovid;
 the cover uses David rather than Dovid.

Dodi means "My Beloved", and can be a reference to God.

Stone Chumash Masoretic notes
Within ArtScroll's Stone Chumash, at the end of each Parsha there is an explanation, authored by him, of that Parsha's Masoretic note.

References

External links
Books authored by Rabbi David Feinstein
ravdovidfeinstein.com

1929 births
2020 deaths
Rosh yeshivas
American Haredi rabbis
Orthodox rabbis from New York City